The 2010 Monte-Carlo Rally, officially 78ème Rallye Automobile de Monte-Carlo, was the first round of the 2010 Intercontinental Rally Challenge (IRC) season. The rally took place over January 19–23, 2010.

Introduction
The rally started in Valence on Tuesday 19 January covering  including  on fifteen special stages. New to the IRC Championship, a  prologue was held on Tuesday evening to determine the starting order for Wednesday's stages. Stages were run both during the day and at night and included the famous Col de Turini.

Entrants for the event included the current IRC Champion Kris Meeke who was seeded at number 1, Formula One driver Robert Kubica, WRC stars Mikko Hirvonen and Toni Gardemeister and Rally Scotland winner Guy Wilks. The event saw the debut of the Ford Fiesta S2000 rally car. A total of 63 crews entered the rally including nineteen S2000 cars.

Results
Finn Mikko Hirvonen driving the Ford Fiesta in competition for the first time and making his debut in the IRC, led the event from start to finish.

Overall

Special stages 

 * The super-special set the running order for the first leg with the top ten running in reverse order from where they finished.

References

External links
 The official website of the Automobile Club de Monaco
 The official website of the Intercontinental Rally Challenge

2010
Rally
Monte Carlo Rally
Monte